Hannut is a city and municipality of Wallonia located in the province of Liège, Belgium. 

On January 1, 2006, Hannut had a total population of 14,291. The total area is 86.53 km² which gives a population density of 165 inhabitants per km².

The municipality consists of the following districts: Abolens, Avernas-le-Bauduin, Avin, Bertrée, Blehen, Cras-Avernas, Crehen, Grand-Hallet, Hannut, Lens-Saint-Remy, Merdorp, Moxhe, Petit-Hallet, Poucet, Thisnes, Trognée, Villers-le-Peuplier, and Wansin.

The Battle of Hannut, which began May 12, 1940, is credited with being the first battle between tanks of World War II.

Transport
Within the city and its immediate surroundings, most distances can be covered on foot or with a bicycle. Within the city centre, road speed regulations prescribe  as the maximum speed limit, making it a pedestrian and bicycle-friendly city. There are also a few car parking lots.
There are several buses, primarily from the public transport company TEC, that connect the city with the region while providing travel options within the city centre.  Bus 127 connects Hannut with Landen railway station and with the city of Huy.
Landen railway station is located on the NMBS railway line 36 (Brussels - Liège). 
The European route E40 passes Hannut 3 km to the North, connecting Hannut with Brussels, Leuven, Liège and the city of Aachen.

See also
 List of protected heritage sites in Hannut
 Plopsaqua Hannut-Landen

References

External links 
 
https://web.archive.org/web/20060107171338/http://www.hannut.be/fr/index.html
https://web.archive.org/web/20051028203641/http://www.fondationresistance.com/actualites/nousavonslu8.htm

 
Cities in Wallonia
Municipalities of Liège Province